Annaïg Charlotte Thérese Butel (born 15 February 1992) is a French footballer who plays as a defender or midfielder for Division 1 Féminine club Paris FC.

She has starred for several youth women's international teams for France. In 2010, Butel played for the under-19 team that won the 2010 UEFA Women's Under-19 Championship.

Personal life
Butel is the younger sister of fellow footballer Gwenaëlle Butel.

Career statistics

International

Notes

References

External links
 UEFA player profile
 
 
  
 Player stats at footofeminin.fr 

1992 births
Living people
French women's footballers
People from Ivry-sur-Seine
France women's youth international footballers
France women's international footballers
Women's association football defenders
2015 FIFA Women's World Cup players
French people of Breton descent
Paris FC (women) players
Division 1 Féminine players
Footballers from Val-de-Marne